The Attorney-General of Queensland is a ministry of the Government of Queensland with responsibility for the state's legal and justice system. 

The current Attorney-General of Queensland is Shannon Fentiman.

List of attorneys-general of Queensland
The following served as Attorney-General of Queensland:

References 

 
Queensland